Bush Dance is an album by saxophonist Johnny Griffin which was recorded in 1978 and released on the Galaxy label in the following year.

Reception

The AllMusic review by Scott Yanow stated: "Johnny Griffin has (at least since the mid-'50s) been one of the masters of the tenor sax although consistently underrated. This studio session is one of his great achievements ... Griffin is inspired and quite creative throughout this highly recommended gem".

Track listing
All compositions by Johnny Griffin, except where indicated.
 "A Night in Tunisia" (Dizzy Gillespie, Frank Paparelli) – 17:05
 "Bush Dance" – 4:56
 "The JAMFs are Coming" – 6:59
 "Since I Fell for You" (Buddy Johnson) – 7:20
 "Knucklebean" (Eddie Marshall) – 7:18

Personnel
Johnny Griffin – tenor saxophone
Cedar Walton – piano
George Freeman – guitar
Sam Jones – bass
Albert Heath – drums
Kenneth Nash – congas, percussion

References

Galaxy Records albums
Johnny Griffin albums
1979 albums
Albums produced by Orrin Keepnews